Legionnaire is a 1998 American drama war film directed by Peter MacDonald and starring Jean-Claude Van Damme as a 1920s boxer who wins a fight after having been hired by gangsters to lose it, then flees to join the French Foreign Legion. The cast includes Adewale Akinnuoye-Agbaje, Daniel Caltagirone, Nicholas Farrell and Steven Berkoff. The film was filmed in Tangier and Ouarzazate, Morocco.

Plot 
Alain Lefèvre (Jean-Claude Van Damme) is a French boxer in 1925 Marseille, France. His brother has asked for him to throw a fight so both can live with the money. Lucien Galgani (Jim Carter), the mobster who forced him to do so, requests he do it in the second round. Galgani's girlfriend Katrina (Ana Sofrenović) is Alain's ex-fiancée, whom he left standing at the altar. But Katrina forgives Alain, and the two hatch a plan to run off to America together.

Alain does not take a dive in the fight, and instead defeats his opponent. Just as the escape plan is about to succeed, Alain's brother is killed, and Katrina is captured by Galgani's men. Alain shoots and kills Galgani's brother; desperately needing a new escape plan, he signs up for the French Foreign Legion and is shipped to North Africa to help defend Morocco against a native Berber rebellion of Rif warriors, led by Abd el-Krim.

Along the way, Alain meets some new friends, including Luther, an African American who has fled injustice in the southern United States and felt that by returning to Africa he would be treated well; Mackintosh, a former British Army Major who was dishonorably discharged due to a gambling problem; and Guido, a naive Italian boy who wishes to impress his fiancée back home by returning as a hero. But things will not be easy. The only real way to escape from the Legion is to survive the term of service and the rebels have them outnumbered.

After marching for days, the current troop arrives at a small pond. Unfortunately, before getting their full share of water, they are ambushed and shot down by the Berbers. Among the dead is Guido. After leaving, the survivors, including Alain, go to the Legion's fort.

Meanwhile, Galgani has sent his hired thugs into the Legion as well, to find Alain and get revenge for his brother. After a few days, they find him in the fort. After the commander sends Alain along with Mackintosh and the others to guard the fort, Mackintosh reveals that he had been sent to kill Alain as part of a deal to reimburse his father, who was left penniless due to gambling debts. Before he can do so, however, they are chased down by the natives, who advance towards the fort.

The colonel sends Luther in a dangerous mission to infiltrate the natives' camp. Alain, knowing it will be suicide, demands to go along but is ordered not to. Before leaving, Luther gives him his harmonica as a symbol of friendship. As Alain is later guarding the fort outside, he sees Luther returning without his disguise, with the Berbers following behind. As they begin attacking, Alain decides to kill Luther in order to give him a quick death.

Very swiftly, the rest of the Berbers take down the Legionnaires. As one of Galgani's thugs is about to kill Alain, he gets shot down by Mackintosh, who remorsefully reveals that Katrina has managed to escape from Galgani and go to America, as she always wanted. Alain, as a token of appreciation, gives him a single bullet so that Mackintosh can commit a merciful suicide. In the end, only Alain stands up alive after the battle. Abd el-Krim, seeing Alain's courage and determination, allows him to live and tells him to inform his superiors what is waiting for them if they continue the colonization. Now the only survivor of the ordeal, Alain is left alone in the desert as he remembers Katrina and his former friends.

There is the alternate/deleted ending in which Alain rescues Katrina and is to originally kill Galgani, but does not (as the director and producer felt it was too violent). There is a script to the alternate ending at the New Year's Eve party when Alain aims his pistol at Galgani, and the place goes quiet. But Alain refrains from killing Galgani and walks out with Katrina.

Cast
 Jean-Claude Van Damme as Alain Lefèvre (nom de guerre Alain Duchamp)
 Adewale Akinnuoye-Agbaje as Luther
 Steven Berkoff as Sergeant Steinkampf
 Nicholas Farrell as Major Mackintosh
 Jim Carter as Lucien Galgani
 Ana Sofrenović as Katrina
 Daniel Caltagirone as Guido Rosetti
 Joseph Long as Maxim
 Mario Kalli as René Galgani
 Joe Montana as Julot
 Kim Romer as Captain Rousselot
 Anders Peter Bro as Lieutenant Charlier
 Paul Kynman as Rolf Bruner
 Vincent Pickering as Viktor
 Takis Triggelis as Corporal Metz
 Tom Delmar as Corporal Legros
 Kamel Krifa as Mohamed Ibn Abdelkrim El-Khattabi / Abd El-Krim

Production

Development
Van Damme originally pitched the story of joining the foreign legion to escape from the mob as a more humorous vehicle starring himself and a comedian such as John Candy.

The often-recorded 1936 song "Mon légionnaire" is sung over the closing credits by Ute Lemper.

Release

Home media
The movie was released as a direct-to-video in the United States, since distributor Lionsgate predicted the movie would do poorly on the box-office because, at that time, Van Damme's drawing power was decreasing drastically.

Reception

Critical response
The film received mixed reviews.

See also
March or Die, a 1977 film using a similar plot.

References

External links
 
 
 

1998 films
1990s action war films
American boxing films
1990s English-language films
Films directed by Peter MacDonald
Films set in 1925
Films set in Morocco
Films set in deserts
Films about the French Foreign Legion
American action war films
Siege films
Films produced by Jean-Claude Van Damme
Films with screenplays by Jean-Claude Van Damme
1990s American films